Antonio Goeters (born 16 March 1973) is a Mexican sailor. He competed in the Laser event at the 1996 Summer Olympics.

References

External links
 

1973 births
Living people
Mexican male sailors (sport)
Olympic sailors of Mexico
Sailors at the 1996 Summer Olympics – Laser
Place of birth missing (living people)